Gorilline gammaherpesvirus 1 (GoHV-1), commonly known as herpesvirus gorilla is a species of virus in the genus Lymphocryptovirus, subfamily Gammaherpesvirinae, family Herpesviridae, and order Herpesvirales.

This species was the fifth to be described in its genus, among species that infect humans, baboons, chimpanzees, and orangutans. As its name implies, Gorilline gammaherpesvirus 1 infects gorillas.

References

External links
 

Gammaherpesvirinae